Lactuca tenerrima is a species of wild lettuce native to southern France, Spain, the Balearic Islands, and the Atlas Mountains of Morocco. Unlike other species in its genus Lactuca, even in its family Asteraceae, it does not produce bitter-tasting sesquiterpene lactones.

References

tenerrima
Plants described in 1788